Modern Motherhood is an exploitation film by Dwain Esper.  Originally released in 1934, it would gain fame by being presented in the style of later road show filmmakers such as Kroger Babb and David F. Friedman, as it was presented around the country and typically featured a "Dynamic Sex Lecture" at each performance.

References

 Felicia Feaster and Bret Wood. Forbidden Fruit: The Golden Age of Exploitation Film. Midnight Marquee Press, 1999.  .
 

1934 drama films
1934 films
American black-and-white films
Films directed by Dwain Esper
American exploitation films
American drama films
1930s English-language films
1930s American films